Hope Ranch is a 2002 American made-for-television western film about a rancher who takes three teenagers from juvenile court to try to turn them around. It stars Bruce Boxleitner, Brian Gross, Richard Lee Jackson, and J. D. Pardo. Hope Ranch was the first The Discovery Channel-Animal Planet original feature film, which initially aired in 2002 and was later released on DVD on March 9, 2004. Hope Ranch was directed by Rex Piano.

Plot summary
J.T. Hope, a former police officer and marine and now owner of the Circle Hope Ranch, decides to start a program for troubled teens on the ranch to help turn them around. The first three boys are Keith (Brian Gross), Brooker (Richard Lee Jackson), and Ernesto (J. D. Pardo). The workers at the ranch are Shorty (Barry Corbin) and a former juvenile delinquent Colt Webb (Lorenzo Lamas), who was given a second chance with the help of J.T. As the program goes on, Brooker and Ernesto make progress but J.T. can't get to Keith. He finds out that Keith was being made to do crime and drugs by his older brother Ajax (Brad Hawkins) and he wasn't actually a bad kid. Keith is driving a tractor and it gets out of control, almost running over a young girl called Molly (Isabelle Howell). JT is really angry at Keith and wants to give up on trying to turn him around, but Molly's mother convinces him to give Keith another chance because he isn't trying to be bad. he next day, the three boys have to go back to Juvenile court, and because they made progress, they are allowed another six months at the ranch, giving Keith another chance. The film ends with three more Juvenile court teenagers arriving at the ranch and Keith telling them the rules of the ranch.

Cast
 Bruce Boxleitner as J.T. Hope
 Barry Corbin as 'Shorty'
 Lorenzo Lamas as Colt Webb
 Brian Gross as Keith Frazier
 Richard Lee Jackson as Booker Stokes
 J. D. Pardo as Ernesto Mendoza
 Gail O'Grady as June Andersen
 Isabelle Howell as Molly
 Laura Johnson as Samantha 'Sam' Brooks
 Brad Hawkins as 'Ajax' Frazier
 Nicholas Hill as Dortch
 Stephen Wozniak as 'Waxy'
 Tina Illman as Rachel
 Clint Jung as Juvenile Court Officer

Critical reception
Carolyn Patricia Scott of The Los Angeles Times gave the film a mixed review, stating that "The jokes and tenderfoot mishaps played out against the great outdoors carry along the entertaining, if predictable, story, although the idea that these hard cases could be redeemed in two weeks requires considerable artifice and contrivance."

References

External links
 

2002 television films
2002 films
American Western (genre) television films
Animal Planet original programming
2002 Western (genre) films
2000s English-language films